Fazl'ollah Mohtadi Sobhi (1897–1962) was an author, story-teller, and teacher in Iran and is considered as one of the most important researchers and collector of Iranian folk tales for children. He gained popularity as a story-teller through his job in Radio Tehran. Sobhi authored two autobiographies (Kitab-i Sobhi and Payam-i Pidar) that also explains in detail his life as a missionary of the Baháʼí Faith and a secretary of 'Abdu'l-Baha, the hardships he endured and what he witnessed that ultimately led him to turn away from the Baháʼí Faith.

Early life 
According to his autobiography Payam-i Pidar, Sobhi was born in Tehran and his father who was originally from Kashan had remarried a few times. His life took a turn for the worse after his father divorced his mother at the age of six (p. 5-6) and he was continuously harassed by his stepmother. His mother passed away when he was eleven (p. 8). At the age of six, his first teacher was a Baháʼí woman by the name of Aghabaygum who taught him to read. However, after threatening to beat him, he was transferred to the Tarbiyat School to continue his primary education (p. 10). He attended the Tarbiyat School for a few years. Finally, due to the constant harassment from his stepmother, he was sent to Qazvin by his father and after a few months set on to a missionary journey that led through Azerbaijan, Georgia, Uzbekistan, and Turkmenistan (pp. 13–44).

After returning to Tehran in 1918 by the insistence of his father, he started a career as a teacher at the Tarbiyat School of Tehran. When the first World War ended, he set off with a number other Baháʼís to visit the Holy land. (p. 45). In 1919, he reached Haifa, Palestine to meet 'Abdu'l Baha, the second leader of the Baháʼí Faith who appointed him as his secretary for two years.

A few years after returning to Tehran, he was excommunicated from the Baháʼí Faith and was forced to leave his father's home due to constant threats he and his father received from the Baháʼí National Spiritual Assembly of Iran. For two months, he lived on the streets and would eat whatever scraps of leftover food he could find, until one of his former teachers hired a room for him to live in (pp. 113-116). He describes this situation in this manner: "You have no idea what this group (the Baháʼís) did to me. I didn't have a place to relax in. I didn't have a loaf of bread to fill my stomach. I didn't have any clothes to protect myself from the cold and the heat. Nor a corner that (I could hide) so as to not see them or hear their tongue lashings." (p. 117).

Career 
As Sobhi himself states, wherever he would apply for work the Baháʼís would tell his employers that this man is unworthy and dishonorable, until finally he started working as a teacher in the Sadat School of Sayyid Yahya Dawlatabadi (a prominent political activist and Azali by faith) and sometime later he started teaching at the American High School in Tehran, Iran (p. 120).

In 1933, he started work at the Higher Academy of Music (Honarestān-e ʿāli-e musiqi) in Tehran where he taught Persian language and literature. Even here the non-stop harassment from Baháʼís continued and he wrote his first autobiography and refutation of the Baháʼí Faith called Kitab-i Sobhi. This book considerably reduced the harassment. (p. 122).

When Radio broadcasting was started in Iran, the section on music and children was delegated to the Higher Academy of Music (Honarestān-e ʿāli-e musiqi) where Sobhi was employed and the children's section was immediately put in the hands of Sobhi (p. 122). Thus in April 1940, he joined Radio Tehran as a story-teller and started broadcasting his children' story program. He had a vast collection of stories from different cultures. He was specialized in comparing Iranian version of stories with other versions such as Aryan stories, from Tajikistan, Afghanistan and India.

His program became very popular, especially among children. He continued this job for 22 years. He is known to be one of the most well-known radio personalities in Iran.

Also for a brief time in 1937–38, he taught at the Law College (Dāneškada-ye ḥoquq).

Connection with the Baháʼí Faith 
َAccording to Sobhi's autobiography, his paternal grandfather was a Muslim scholar from Kashan by the name of Haj Mulla Ali Akbar. His wife was secretly a Babi that had converted her children to Babism then Baháʼísm and Sobhi was born into the Baháʼí Faith. This grandmother was the aunt of Baha'u'llah's third wife, Gawhar. Subhi's mother was from a Muslim Family and secretly a Baháʼí too. She was in a bigamist relationship with Sobhi's father.

While a pupil at the Tarbiyat school, he would attend Baháʼí classes in his free time under the supervision of a number of prominent Baháʼí teachers. He would debate with Muslims and was even punished a number of times at school for engaging in similar discussions (pp. 13-44). In 1916–17, he went to Caucasus as a Baháʼí missionary. He returned to Iran in 1918. In 1919, he traveled to Haifa, Palestine to meet 'Abdu'l Baha, the second leader of the Baháʼí Faith, who appointed him as his secretary for two years.

According to Sobhi "We were promised the finest of spiritual foods in the Baháʼí faith, but we came away hungry." As he mentions throughout his book, Sobhi states that he had witnessed many immoral acts from the Baháʼí community and missionaries in both in Iran and abroad and these always irritated him. However, they were never a cause of doubt for him for he was always told these are tests from God (p. 15). His first real doubts started after seeing 'Abdu'l-Baha for the first time and realizing that he was nothing like how he was described by Baha'i missionaries (p. 48-50). Finally after seeing how Mírzá Muhammad ʻAlí was treated by 'Abdu'l-Baha and his followers he devised a plan to extend his 19-day stay in Haifa to investigate the truth, and presented 'Abdu'l-Baha with his writing skills. 'Abdu'l-Baha immediately asked him to stay as his secretary (pp. 66-68).

He recounts many things that troubled him in Palestine. 'Abdu'l-Baha posing as a Hanafi Sunni and attending the Friday prayers at the Muslim mosque and denying he was part of a new religion (p . 52 and 90), accepting Knighthood from the British crown while a number of Muslims had rejected it at the same time (p . 80), 'Abdu'l-Baha's close relatives indulged in leisure and living off the money sent by Baháʼís from abroad (p . 82 and 91), bias and discrimination in favor of western pilgrims over Iranian pilgrims (p . 98) and 'Abdu'l-Baha's constant belittling of the people of Iran in his letters to the western Baháʼís (p . 99).

Having socialized with Shoghi Effendi for two years while he was a secretary of 'Abdu'l-Baha, Sobhi could not accept that Shoghi had taken the reigns of the Baháʼí community that came as a complete surprise to many who closely knew him (p . 104). He recounts in many places of his book what he had witnessed from Shoghi including his constant bad-mouthing and cold behavior towards his closest family members (pp . 125-127), his inclination toward homosexuality (p . 84), and spending the money sent by Baháʼís to the Holy Land without the consent of 'Abdu'l-Baha (including a large sum of money that he had taken from Ruth White) that had ultimately led to 'Abdu'l-Baha losing trust in him in the last years of his life (p . 129).

Sobhi's strong opposition to Shoghi Effendi's appointment as a Guardian of the Baháʼí Faith was reported to Shoghi Effendi. In a letter dated 19 October 1927 to the National Spiritual Assembly of the Baháʼís of Iran, Shoghi Effendi wrote that Sobhi and his kind who are found to be engaging in satanic whispers, should be encouraged to return to the Baháʼí way, and if they decline they would be excommunicated and it would be forbidden for all Baháʼís to socialize or speak with them. Finally, In 1928, the Baháʼí council in Iran expelled him from the Baháʼí community.

Death 
Sobhi did not marry, he lived a simple life, alone. He died of larynx cancer in 1962. He was buried in the Zahir-od-dowleh cemetery in Tehran.

Works 

Sobhi's works can be divided in two categories. The first are autobiographies that he wrote to refute the Baháʼí Faith and his reason for leaving it. He published two books: 
 Kitab-i Sobhi (The Book of Sobhi) : His first book refuting the Baháʼí Faith, 1933.
 Payam-i Pidar (The Father's Message): A continuation of His first book for rejection of the Baháʼí Faith, 1956. He states in the introduction of this book that the first book is inadequate in responding to the many questions that his audience have and he has written this book to respond to these questions.
The second category included collections of folk-lore and fairy tales. The following list enumerates a number of these works:
 Afsaneha (Fairy Tales): A collection of Persian stories and fairy tales, Two volumes, 1946.
 Afsanehay-i Kuhan (Ancient Fairy Tales): A collection of stories, 1949.
 Dastanha-i Melal (Stories of the Nations): َ A collection of stories from different countries such as Iran, Russia, Georgia, Azerbaijan, and Denmark, 1948.
 Amoo Nawrooz (Uncle Nawrooz): A collection of 26 Short stories in Persian. One of the stories called the Legend of Uncle Nawrooz narrates the story of Uncle Nawrooz who is the symbol of spring and a new year.
 Deje Hoosh Roba (The Mind Stealing Castle): Story of three men who set on a journey to win a Chinese princess's hand in marriage. The story is based on a poem with the same name from the Persian Poet Rumi.
 Hajj Mirza Zulfali: 1947.
 Dastanhay-i Divan-i Balkh (Stories from the Courthouse of Balkh): The story of a corrupt judge working in the courthouse of Balkh who tries to kill a girl that he has fallen in love with but refuses to marry him.
 Afsanehay-i Bastani Iran wa Majar (Ancient Iranian and Hungarian Fairy Tales): A collection of nineteen stories, 1943.

References 

Iranian radio presenters
Former Bahá'ís
1897 births
1962 deaths
Iranian Shia Muslims